Gregory Lamont Lee (born January 15, 1965) is a former American football defensive back who played one season for the Pittsburgh Steelers of the NFL. He went undrafted in the 1988 NFL draft, he played college football at Arkansas State University for the Arkansas State Red Wolves football team.

References

1965 births
Living people
Players of American football from Arkansas
Sportspeople from Pine Bluff, Arkansas
American football defensive backs
Pittsburgh Steelers players
Arkansas State Red Wolves football players